Heidi Johanningmeier (born July 29, 1982) is an American actress. She has a recurring role as Charity in the HBO television series Somebody Somewhere, which premiered in January 2022. She has appeared in recurring roles on the television series Chicago P.D. and Proven Innocent, was a lead in the film 100 Days to Live and had a main role in the film One Small Hitch.

Johanningmeier was inspired to become an actress after performing an individual performance project as Joan of Arc while in middle school. In 2006, Johanningmeier appeared in a production of Anton Chekhov's The Cherry Orchard at the Mark Taper Forum in Los Angeles.

For her role in the 2019 short film Her Story, Johanningmeier was awarded Best Actress at the 2019 Noida International Film Festival. 

In May 2019, Johanningmeier participated in a SAG-AFTRA panel discussion about the misuse of deep fake technologies with Los Angeles Congressman Adam Schiff and actress Alyssa Milano after her likeness was used in a scene in a film without her permission.

Filmography

References

External links
 

1982 births
Living people
American actresses
People from Iowa
21st-century American women